Pretty Rhythm: Aurora Dream is an anime television series produced by Tatsunoko Production and Avex Pictures based on the Japanese arcade game of the same name by Takara Tomy. The series is centered on Aira Harune, a Prism Star who performs Prism Shows. The series aired in Japan on TV Tokyo from April 9, 2011 to March 31, 2012. The series was originally set to debut on April 2, 2011, but it was postponed by a week due to the 2011 Tohoku earthquake. The English dub aired on Animax Asia from January 31, 2014 to April 11, 2014. In addition to the television series, several two-minute shorts were released exclusively onto the DVD home releases. It was followed by its direct sequel series Pretty Rhythm: Dear My Future.

A live-action segment titled "Pretty Rhythm Studio" appeared in every episode. It is hosted by Akina Minami (nicknamed Akkina) and is centered on the Prism Mates, three trainees from Avex Dance Master consisting of Mia Kusakabe, Reina Kubo, and Karin Takahashi, chronicling their training in dance, singing, and fashion sense to debut as idols, like the main characters in the show. Near the end of the series, the Prism Mates debuted in the group Prizmmy along with Ayami Sema, the winner of the Pretty Rhythm Award at the Kiratto Entertainment Challenge Contest 2011 Summer.

The opening theme songs are "You May Dream" by Lisp for episodes 1-29 and "Catch My Heart 1000%" by Pretty Rhythm All Stars for episodes 30-51. The ending theme songs are "Happy Go Lucky (Happy Lucky de Go)" by Super Girls for episodes 1-12; "We Will Win (Kokoro no Baton de Po Pon no Pon)" by Tokyo Girls' Style for episodes 13-26; "Pretty Rhythm de Go" by MARs (Kana Asumi, Sayuri Hara, and Azusa Kataoka as their characters) for episodes 27-39; and "Everybody's Gonna Be Happy" by Prizmmy for episodes 40-51.

Episode list

Pretty Rhythm: Aurora Dream

Prism Comedy Theater

 is a series of 2-minute shorts released as exclusives on the DVD and Blu-ray home release. Each disc is bundled with two episodes.

References

Pretty Rhythm: Aurora Dream
Pretty Rhythm